Sona Mehring is an American businesswoman and the founder and past CEO of the nonprofit 501(c)(3) organization CaringBridge. In 1997, she created the first CaringBridge website to create a free service for communication between friends and family informed when someone is facing any health issues. Each website includes pictures and journal updates, as well as an online guestbook allowing all parties to stay informed without placing extra demands on hospital staff.

Work history 
Currently, owner of 10ForFocus.com that provides implementer services for the Entrepreneurial Operating System (EOS) as well as speaking engagements.

Mehring was founder/CEO of CaringBridge from 1997-2017.

Before CaringBridge, Mehring was president of Beacon Point Technologies for 14 years. Prior to that she was technology director at PlanAnalytics, Inc. and an independent consultant for GMAC ResCap. She has also served as a software engineer at Apertus Technologies Inc., Unisys, Diamond Computer Solutions, and General Dynamics. An early adopter of Internet technologies, Mehring has been actively involved in the development of several widely used software applications.

Awards and recognition 
Throughout her career, Mehring has received several honors and awards. In 2015, Sona was named a 'Titan of Technology' by Minneapolis/St. Paul Business Journal.  She was recognized as one of 2011’s “Most Influential Women in Technology” by Fast Company. In 2010, she was named in the Twin Cities Business Magazine's list of 200 Minnesotans You Should Know 2010 Twin Cities Business Superstars. In 2009, she was named one of 25 Women Industry Leaders in the Twin Cities by the Minneapolis/St. Paul Business Journal. In 2008, she received a Certificate of Special Congressional Recognition in recognition of outstanding and invaluable service to the community. In 2006, she was recognized and highlighted by MSN as one of the nation's leading Women Working for Change  and was a participant at Fortune Magazine's Most Powerful Women Summit. She is a recipient of the University of Wisconsin-Eau Claire Alumni Distinguished Achievement(2011) and Excellence(2006) Award. She was a finalist for the Minnesota High Tech Association's TEKNE award in 2004, an honoree at Medica’s 2004 Speaking of Women's Health Conference, and a 2004 nominee for the Volvo for Life Award.

Mehring is a member of Women Business Leaders of the U.S. Health Care Industry Foundation, Minnesota Council of Nonprofits, National Health Council and the National Health Marketing Leadership Roundtable.

Media coverage
 The Grindstone "Executive Suite: CaringBridge’s Sona Mehring On Being The One Woman In The Room"
 Mississippi Medical News "Sona Mehring Connects Mississippians to Patients Enduring Serious Health Crises"
 ThirdAge.com "Women Who Inspire: Sona Mehring, Creator of CaringBridge"
 Womenetics "Collision of Technology and Health Creates CaringBridge"
 Fast Company "Most Influential Women in Technology" 
 Twin Cities Business "CaringBridge Comes of Age in an Age of Social Media"
 TECHdotMN "Meet Minnesota’s Radical Tech CEO #3: Sona Mehring"
 Twin Cities Business "Health Care Heroes 2010"
 Crazy Sexy Life "Harnessing the Internet for Hope and Support"
 Today show
 ABC news

References

External links
 UWEC Alumni Awards
 Top 25 Business Leaders

Living people
American computer businesspeople
University of Wisconsin–Eau Claire alumni
1961 births
20th-century American businesspeople
20th-century American businesswomen
21st-century American businesspeople
21st-century American businesswomen
Businesspeople from Wisconsin
People from Appleton, Wisconsin
People from Weyauwega, Wisconsin